Husker may refer to:
 A Nebraska resident (current or former).
 A Nebraska Cornhusker, student of the University of Nebraska, Lincoln; particularly as representing that institution in interscholastic activities.
 William Adama's callsign in the reimagined Battlestar Galactica television series.
 Hüsker Dü, American hardcore punk/alternative rock band.
 Husker, a fictional character in the television series Hazbin Hotel.